Sidney Taurel (born February 9, 1949, in Casablanca) is an American businessman. He is the chairman of Pearson plc and chairman emeritus of Eli Lilly and Company, where he had a 37-year career and served as chairman and  chief executive officer from 1998 to 2008. He became chairman of Pearson in January 2016. He is currently a director of IBM Corporation and  advises Almirall S.A. on issues of corporate strategy.

Education/ Personal life

Taurel had his primary and secondary education in Casablanca, Morocco. After graduating from HEC Paris business school (École des Hautes Études Commerciales de Paris), in 1969, he received an MBA degree from Columbia Business School in 1971. He later received a doctorate in human letters honoris causa from Indiana University. 
He married Kathryn H Fleischmann from São Paulo, Brazil in 1977; they had 3 children, Alex (born in Paris in 1979), Patrick (born in 1982 in São Paulo) and Olivia (born in 1988 in Indianapolis). They became American citizens in 1995. Kathryn died in 2014.

Eli Lilly and Company
Taurel joined the Lilly subsidiary Eli Lilly International Corporation in 1971 as a marketing associate. After sales and marketing assignments in Indianapolis, São Paulo, and Paris, he became general manager of the company's affiliate in Brazil in 1981 and was appointed to the London-based position of vice president of Lilly European operations in 1983. He was named executive vice president of Eli Lilly and Company and president of its pharmaceutical division in 1993. Three years later, he was promoted to president and chief operating officer.
As chairman and CEO from 1998 to 2008 Taurel led the company's efforts to successfully tackle the challenge of the patent loss of its main product Prozac while remaining independent; he drove a deeper globalization of the company, significantly increased its commitment to R&D and partnering, and oversaw the successful launches of a dozen new products, roughly doubling the company's sales. He spoke often on behalf of the pharmaceutical industry, serving as chairman of its association PhRMA in 1998/ 1999.

Accolades

A U.S. citizen since 1995, Sidney received the 2000 Ellis Island Medal of Honor from the National Ethnic Coalition of Organizations. Also in 2001, the Anti-Defamation League honored Taurel with its American Heritage Award.

In 2002, was named by U.S. President George W. Bush as a Homeland Security Advisory Council member. In 2003, Bush named Taurel a member of the President's Export Council. In April 2007, he was appointed to the Advisory Committee for Trade Policy and Negotiations by President Bush. He is an officer of the French Legion of Honor.

Taurel is a past president of the Pharmaceutical Research and Manufacturers of America (PhRMA). He is a member of The Business Council, and a past member of the Business Roundtable, as well as of the boards of ITT Industries, McGraw-Hill Companies, and the RCA Tennis Championships. He is also a member of the board of overseers of Columbia Business School and a trustee at Indianapolis Museum of Art.

In October 2015, Taurel was appointed as chairman of Pearson plc, the British multinational publishing and education company headquartered in London.

References

External links
Frontline Interview with Sidney Taurel June 19, 2003

1949 births
Living people
American health care chief executives
American people of Moroccan descent
Businesspeople in the pharmaceutical industry
HEC Paris alumni
Columbia Business School alumni
Presidents of Eli Lilly and Company
Pearson plc people
IBM people
People from Casablanca
Businesspeople from Indianapolis
American chief operating officers